Pang Jin (born 27 September 1960) is a Chinese fencer. He competed in the team épée event at the 1984 Summer Olympics.

References

1960 births
Living people
Chinese male épée fencers
Olympic fencers of China
Fencers at the 1984 Summer Olympics